Costa Hermosa  is a corregimiento in Montijo District, Veraguas Province, Panama with a population of 1,550 as of 2010. It was created by Law 42 of April 30, 2003.

References

Corregimientos of Veraguas Province